Credit Suisse First Boston (Europe) Ltd v Lister [1998] EWCA Civ 1551 is a UK labour law case, concerning the effects of a business transfer on an employee's rights at work.

Facts
The transferee of the business that Mr Lister worked for, Credit Suisse,  put a gardening clause into 209 employees’ new contracts. Mr Lister, who had been the head of European Equities, sought an injunction. The employees also had some advantageous new terms from the old ones under Barclays de Zoete Wedd.

Judgment
Clarke LJ held that the gardening clause was contrary to the purpose of now TUPER 2006 regulation 4 and contrary to the purpose of the Business Transfers Directive.

See also

UK labour law
Credit Suisse v. Billing

Notes

References

United Kingdom labour case law
Court of Appeal (England and Wales) cases
1998 in case law
1998 in British law
Credit Suisse
Credit Suisse First Boston